Yummly  is an American website and mobile app that provides users recipes via recommendations and a search engine. Yummly uses a knowledge graph to offer a semantic web search engine for food, cooking and recipes.

In 2014, Yummly had 15 million active users in the US and launched international websites in the UK, Germany and The Netherlands.

In May 2017, the company was acquired by appliance maker Whirlpool Corporation and allowed to operate as a subsidiary, keeping its current head office.

History
The company was founded by David Feller and Vadim Geshel in early 2009. Feller was previously with Half.com, eBay and StumbleUpon. Yummly raised 7.8 million in venture capital and was backed by First Round Capital, Harrison Metal Capital, Intel Capital, and Unilever Ventures.

The Yummly app was named "Best of 2014" in Apple's App Store.

API 
In March 2013, Yummly opened access to its application programming interface to other companies as a paid service. The API allows searching for ingredients, cooking methods, and nutritional data.

See also
 List of websites about food and drink

References

External links 
 

American cooking websites
Internet properties established in 2009
American social networking websites
Semantic Web
Semantic Web companies
Recommender systems
Aggregation websites
Domain-specific search engines
IOS software
Android (operating system) software
Universal Windows Platform apps
Whirlpool Corporation brands